Aprompronou (also known as Apprompron) is a village in eastern Ivory Coast. It is in the sub-prefecture of Diamarakro, Bettié Department, Indénié-Djuablin Region, Comoé District.

Until 2012, Aprompronou was in  the commune of Apprompron-Afêwa. In March 2012, Apprompron-Afêwa became one of 1126 communes nationwide that were abolished.

Notes

Populated places in Comoé District
Populated places in Indénié-Djuablin